The 2015–16 NBB season was the 8th season of the Novo Basquete Brasil, the Brazilian basketball league. Once again this tournament was organized entirely by the Liga Nacional de Basquete (LNB). The NBB also qualified teams for international tournaments such as Liga Sudamericana and FIBA Americas League.

This season fifteen teams were played each other in the regular season. At the end of the home and away matches round the top four teams qualified for the quarterfinals of the playoffs automatically, while the teams finishing in the 5th and 12th place participated in the first round of the playoffs to determine the other four teams in the quarterfinals, in a five-match series. This year NBB returned to a series in the Finals, played in a best of three-match.

For this season, only the last regular season placed was relegated to the Liga Ouro, the NBB second division. The Liga Ouro winner receive the right to contest NBB in the next year.

Participating teams 
New teams in the league
Caxias do Sul Basquete (2015 Liga Ouro champions, promoted)
Vitória (2015 Liga Ouro runners-up, promoted)

Teams that left the league
Uberlândia
Palmeiras
Limeira

Head coach changes
Pre-season changes

Mid-season changes

Regular season

League table

Results

NBB All-Star Weekend

Playoffs

References

External links

 

2015-16
NBB
Brazil